Myripristinae is a subfamily of the Holocentridae fish.

They are typically known as soldierfish.

References

External links
 
 
 

Holocentridae
Ray-finned fish subfamilies
Taxa named by John Richardson (naturalist)